Lucius Cornelius Sulla was a Roman senator of the Augustan age. He was ordinary consul as the colleague of Augustus in 5 BC. The only other office attested for him was as a member of the Septemviri epulonum, which he was co-opted into after his praetorship.

Ronald Syme believed he was a son of Publius Cornelius Sulla, designated consul for 65 BC, which made him a grandnephew of the Roman dictator Lucius Cornelius Sulla. The son of Lucius, Cornelius Sulla, was expelled from the Senate by Tiberius in AD 17.

References

Further reading 
 Werner Eck, "Cornelius [II 58]" in Brill's New Pauly (online edition).
 Prosopographia Imperii Romani (PIR2) C 1460

1st-century BC Romans
Imperial Roman consuls
Cornelii Sullae
Augustus
Roman patricians
Epulones of the Roman Empire